is a video game character in The King of Fighters fighting game series developed by SNK Playmore. His first appearance was in The King of Fighters 2003 as leader of its Hero Team. Ash, a teenager, participates in the series' fighting tournaments. He employs a personal fighting style that involves pyrokinesis with green flames. Despite being the series' protagonist since its third story arc, Ash's behavior is generally antagonistic and he tries to steal powers from several recurring characters, leaving them powerless. His identity and intentions are further explored in the 2011 title, The King of Fighters XIII, and he has been featured in print adaptations and a drama CD based on the games.

SNK Playmore staff created Ash as an evil main character, in contrast to previous main characters. His moves have been reworked in every game in which he has appeared, gaining new techniques as a result of his actions or modified to balance the character roster. Critical response to Ash has been largely negative due to his androgynous appearance and his technique. In interviews and press releases, video game publisher UTV Ignition Entertainment noted that he was unpopular with Western gamers and his design was better suited to Japanese fans. Reception in later years has been slightly more positive, with the character's relationships and tragic story arc being well received.

Appearances 
Introduced in The King of Fighters 2003, Ash leads the New Hero Team of Duo Lon and Shen Woo which participates in a new King of Fighters tournament. After the tournament, he ambushes host Chizuru Kagura and steals her powers, telling Iori Yagami he will be his next opponent. In The King of Fighters XI, the character teams up with Oswald and Shen Woo. At the game's end Ash leaves his teammates to fight each other, after disclosing that Oswald's price for joining him was finding a drug he can only obtain after defeating their pharmacist's enemy, their own teammate Shen. He later finds a berserker, Iori, defeats him and steals his powers. When Ash's comrade Elisabeth Blanctorche accuses him of abandoning his original mission and becoming obsessed with power, he leaves after saying that Kyo Kusanagi will be his next victim. Ash also appears as an available fighter in the KOF: Maximum Impact 2'''s update KOF Maximum Impact Regulation A and The King of Fighters XII, games without a storyline.

In The King of Fighters XIII Ash is the only character not part of a team, and it is learned that he works for Those From the Past (seen in 2003 and XI). However, he has a conflict with organization leader Saiki at the end of the game, with his real plan revealed. He ultimately sacrifices himself to destroy Saiki, his very own ancestor. While Ash's memories start disappearing from almost every people who knew him, he still makes cameos in some endings.

It is revealed in The King of Fighters XIV that Ash is trapped in a time vortex, with an entity known as Verse enveloping him. It is later also revealed that Verse, along with an unnamed blue creature, whose half of their power fragments somehow implanted into young Shun'ei, was created from Ash's result on changing his timeline back in the previous tournament, creating timeline interferences and resulting in  Samurai Shodown's Nakoruru traveling to the present and stuck there, along with a time-displaced Mui Mui of Dragon Gal and Love Heart of Sky Love. The new tournament participant, Kukri of the Official Invitation Team, is hired by Elisabeth to find Ash's whereabouts. With Verse's defeat as his reality manipulation energy spreads around worldwide, Kukri and Elisabeth finally found Ash alive. Due to the ongoing multiversal crisis which revives many deceased fighters like himself in his home universe, he returns in The King of Fighters XV, accompanied by his childhood friend Elisabeth, and their new ally, Kukri, and manage to survive the event without ceasing from existence, thanks to Kukri's confirmation of the outcome on defeating Otoma=Raga, thus finally live peacefully with Elisabeth once again.

Ash has made appearances in various other King of Fighters media as well. In the fourth chapter of the anime The King of Fighters: Another Day, he sets fire to a city to lure Kyo into a trap. He is also prominent in the manhua adaptations of The King of Fighters 2003 by Wing Yang and King Tung. In the 2003 tournament, Ash's team is defeated in the final but later helps defeat the demon Mukai. Although he is not part of the recurring tournament in The King of Fighters XII manhua, he briefly confronts Kyo in an attempt to steal his powers. Ash also appears in the CD drama KOF: Mid Summer Struggle, which has a mock King of Fighters tournament. Outside The King of Fighters, the character appears in a dating sim part of the Days of Memories series.

Creation and development
Ash was designed as an "attractive evil character", in contrast to previous King of Fighters heroes. The supervising designer created the character as desired, with few changes since conception. When The King of Fighters 2003 was released and Ash introduced, the staff did not want to disclose information about him, instead telling fans to look forward to his "exploits." His canonical height is 178 cm (5'10") and he weighs 59 kg (130 lbs). According to a staff member, Falcoon, the goal was to make Ash an ambiguous protagonist who made players "feel bad" for cheering for him. Although Falcoon did not design the character, he added details while illustrating him. Due to Ash's late appearance in The King of Fighters 2003, the staff joked that teammate Shen Woo seemed more like the series' main character than Ash did. For The King of Fighters XIII, producer Kei Yamamoto wanted gamers who had played previous titles with Ash to consider the character's motivation and whether they could relate to him. One of three reasons for the title of KOF: Maximum Impact 2 Regulation "A" was Ash's introduction to the spin-off series.  Falcoon called the character "really wild" because of his role in the series and his personality. Nona (another artist in charge) said that of the original King of Fighters characters, he liked Ash and looked forward to his development.

In The King of Fighters XII Ash was the character the staff worked on the most, reworking his movements and speech to be more consistent with the rest of the cast. The King of Fighters XIII producer Kei Yamamoto jokingly called him a character players could use to "show off". His EX version in the game makes more multiple hits than his regular form, and the "disgusting" style of his  move is said to fit his character. Since his introduction, Ash has acquired new moves in accordance with his action in the series. After The King of Fighters 2003 Ash gained Chizuru Kagura's , a move allowing him to steal his opponents' special moves. After defeating Iori Yagami, the character acquired the  Neo Max move (his strongest attack in The King of Fighters XIII). During the game's development, the staff considered returning Fructidor's animation style to an earlier version they had tested.

Artist Ogura stated that designing Ash's final form was conceived shortly after he saw early designs of Saiki. Following this, Ogura tried drawing Ash's possessed form from The King of Fighters XIII where he was careful in showing that while the enemy's body is Ash's, the one fighting is Saiki as represented by his black flames. Despite early pressure about that, once seeing Saiki's similarities with Ash, Ogura managed to draw the Evil Ash easily. The idea behind this character was giving an vibe of a repulsive person.

For The King of Fighters XV, designer Tomohiro Nakata said several fans already knew The King of Fighters XIV would tease his return. In his reappearance in XV, Ash was given a new design reminiscennt of the original one. While SNK looked forward to his interactions to his previous enemies Chizuru and Iori, they were also glad that he managed to join his friend Elizabeth for the first time in the franchise due to their close relationship.

Reception
Ash Crimson's character had a mixed reception in video-game publications. When he was introduced, GameSpys Christian Nutt called him a "clone" of Guile from the Street Fighter series because of their similar movesets but Ash's team was praised as new characters with new elements in the series. Lucas M. Thomas of IGN wrote that a major fan complaint was the character's strength in the games, which made him one of the strongest opponents despite an apparent lack of effort. According to Thomas, Ash is "nothing if not strange" and the writer lamented his many appearances in the KOF 2003 manhua compared with more-popular characters. When playable characters for the arcade version of The King of Fighters XIII were introduced, Anime News Networks Todd Ciolek speculated about Ash's lack of teammates and wondered if he was alone because "no one likes Ash now." Marissa Meli of UGO Networks ranked Ash sixteenth on a list of "The Most Androgynous Video Game Characters", with Meli jokingly attributing his androgynous appearance to a desire by Japanese designers to confuse Western gamers about their sexuality. Although he called Ash's voice one of "Gaming's Top 10 Deepest Voices", Dan Howdle of Now Gamer referred to him as a female character and writers for Game Informer joked about their surprise at the discovery that Ash is a male character. After UTV Ignition Entertainment polled fans to choose an artbox for console versions of The King of Fighters XII, the company announced that Ash's unpopularity reduced the number of potential covers to two (featuring Kyo and Iori). Den of Geek listed Ash as the 23rd best The King of Fighters with the writer comparing him with Loki based on their antagonistic and tricky behaviour as well as how his heroic traits in KOF XIII gave fans different thoughts. Complex listed him as one of gaming's "douchiest" characters androgynous look as well as how he steals the powers of Chizuru Kagura and Iori Yagami. GamesRadar found the character's name as one of the worst one ever seen in gaming.

In an interview with Ignition Entertainment director of business development Shane Bettehausen, Alex Lucard of Diehard GameFan said that North American SNK fans detested Ash and complained about his inclusion in The King of Fighters XII without a storyline while popular series characters were overlooked. Bettehausen defended the character, calling him "nuanced and improved" and his moves "incredibly effective". In June 2009, Stephen Totilo of Kotaku interviewed Bettehausen, who asked him while Totilo was playing to guess Ash's gender. When Totilo said the character was female, Betehausen called KOF "progressive" in introducing a cross-dressing character and said that fans were apparently "warming up to him". On Destructoid, Jonathan Holmes praised Ash's character as "defying traditional gender roles while kicking some ass" and called him "the perfect mascot for the KoF series as a whole." Kevin S.from GameRevolution wondered about his removal in The King of Fighters XIV'' seeing Ash as a "fan favorite" character. Merchandising related to Ash's appearance has also been released.

References

Fictional French people in video games
Fictional martial artists in video games
Male characters in video games
SNK protagonists
The King of Fighters characters
Video game bosses
Video game characters introduced in 2003
Video game characters with fire or heat abilities